Chris Evert and Martina Navratilova were the defending champions but both players chose not to participate.

Fiorella Bonicelli and Gail Lovera won in the final 6–4, 1–6, 6–3 against Kathleen Harter and Helga Masthoff.

Draw

Finals

Top half

Bottom half

References

External links
1976 French Open – Women's draws and results at the International Tennis Federation
1976 French Open – Women's draws and results at the Women's Tennis Association (page 2)

Women's Doubles
French Open by year – Women's doubles
1976 in women's tennis
1976 in French women's sport